Jean Baptiste Louis DeCourtel Marchand,  aka Captain Francois Marchand de Courcelles, was an eighteenth century French officer that served in the French colonies in America, and died after a second tour or duty ending in 1734.  Marchand fathered two children with Sehoy, a  daughter of the matrilineal Wind Clan of the Creek Nation, during his time in Alabama: Chief Red Shoes  (1720 d. 1784)  and Sehoy II Marchand (1722-1785), herself mother of Sehoy III McPherson (with trader Malcolm McPherson) and Creek Chief Alexander McGillivray (with trader Lachlan McGillivray). Moreover William Weatherford, the notorious Red Eagle, and his half-brother the mestizo Charles Weatherford were the sons of Sehoy III. 

Captain Marchand was the French military commanding officer of the colonial trading post at Fort Toulouse, who suppressed a rebellion around 1721 and was relieved of his command or left abruptly around 1722, and returned for another tour.

External links

 City of Wetumpka
 Fort Toulouse/ Jackson State Park
 Toulouse-Fort Jackson State Historic Site
 Fort Toulouse & Fort Jackson Living History Groups
 Self-published list of descendants

1722 deaths
Year of birth unknown
People from Wetumpka, Alabama
People of New France